Louis Kniep (April 10, 1876 – February 22, 1967) was an American gymnast. He competed in three events at the 1904 Summer Olympics.

References

1876 births
1967 deaths
American male artistic gymnasts
Olympic gymnasts of the United States
Gymnasts at the 1904 Summer Olympics
Gymnasts from New Jersey
People from Millburn, New Jersey
Sportspeople from Essex County, New Jersey